The Sun was a newspaper published in Canterbury, New Zealand.

History 
The newspaper commenced publication in February 1914. It was published until July 1935 when it merged with its competitor, The Star, and continued as the Christchurch Star-Sun. The name was simplified to The Christchurch Star in 1958 and publication ceased in 1991.

References

Defunct newspapers published in New Zealand
Canterbury, New Zealand
1914 establishments in New Zealand
Publications established in 1914